Bokhan may refer to:
Bokhan (rural locality), a rural locality (a settlement) in Irkutsk Oblast, Russia
2338 Bokhan, an asteroid